Fred Melamed (born May 13, 1956) is an American actor, comedian, and writer. He is best known for portraying Sy Ableman in the Coen Brothers' A Serious Man (2009). He is also known for his collaborations with Woody Allen appearing in seven of his films including Hannah and Her Sisters (1986), Radio Days (1987), and Crimes and Misdemeanors (1989). His other film roles include In a World... (2012), Hail, Caesar! (2016), and Shiva Baby (2020).

His notable television roles include Bruce Ben-Bacharach in Lady Dynamite (2016–2017), Gumbald in Adventure Time (2017–2018), Arthur Hart in WandaVision (2021) and Tom Posorro in Barry (2022). Vulture named him one of the greatest character actors working today, and he was listed among Harry Domenico Rossi's 25 Greatest Screen Villains of All Time.

Early life
Melamed was born to a secular Jewish family in New York City, New York. His biological mother is actress/director Nancy Zala and his biological father, British psychoanalyst Stan Silverstone, was a relative of the prominent Adler acting family, including Luther and Stella Adler. He is the adopted son of Louis, a New York television producer, and Syma (Krichefsky) Melamed, a sometime actress and housewife. He attended the Hunter College Elementary School, a primary school for gifted children, and Riverdale Country School.

His father worked with TV pioneer Nat Hiken on such shows as Car 54, Where Are You? and The Phil Silvers Show. When he was sixteen, his family had financial difficulties, and was forced to move to Hollywood, Florida. Melamed has said that he was raised in a non-believer Jewish family who never went to synagogue, except to attend a cousin's bar mitzvah. When he was asked if he wanted to attend Hebrew school, he said no, and thus had no religious training. However, he credits his non-religious upbringing as helping him to develop a belief in God later in life, as he had no "forced dogma to overcome."

Career

Early career 
He began his theatrical training at Hampshire College, where he worked with (and was heavily influenced by) Tina Packer, John Guare, Jean-Claude van Itallie, and members of The Living Theatre.  Melamed then entered the Yale School of Drama. At Yale, he was a Samuel F. B. Morse College Graduate Fellow. He was also a nominee for the Irene Ryan Award, a prize conferred upon the most promising young actors in the United States. While still at Yale, he was an instructor at the well-known performing arts camp, Stagedoor Manor. After his training, he appeared on stage with several resident theatre companies, including The Guthrie Theater, the John F. Kennedy Center for the Performing Arts, The Yale Repertory Theater, and on Broadway in the Tony Award-winning Amadeus. Following Amadeus, Melamed entered what he called "a period of personal darkness", during which he effectively stopped acting on stage. At the same time, with an insider's understanding of the industry and assistance from his agent, he became established as a voice actor, and continued to do film work.

Melamed's voice became a familiar presence on television, serving as the sound of the Olympics, Mercedes Benz, CBS Sports, USA Network, the Super Bowl, and numerous commercials and television programs. He became known within the industry as a voice actor, appearing in the Grand Theft Auto series, and dubbing several actors' entire performances in films.

Melamed's feature film debut was in Marshall Brickman's 1983 romantic comedy, Lovesick, starring Dudley Moore and Elizabeth McGovern. Melamed's second film was Woody Allen's comedy-drama Hannah and Her Sisters (1986). In addition, Melamed has prolifically appeared in other Allen films. He has appeared in more Allen movies than any other actor besides Diane Keaton and Mia Farrow (and Allen himself). He has appeared in Radio Days (1987), Another Woman (1988), Crimes and Misdemeanors (1989), Shadows and Fog (1991), Husbands and Wives (1992), and Hollywood Ending (2000). During the 1980s Melamed played significant supporting roles in Roland Joffé's religious epic The Mission (1986), Elaine May's comedy Ishtar (1987). Also in 1987, he appeared in Peter Yates' legal mystery thriller Suspect (1987) starring Cher, Dennis Quaid, and Liam Neeson as well as the romantic comedy The Pickup Artist starring Robert Downey Jr. and Molly Ringwald. The following year he appeared in The Good Mother (1988), opposite Diane Keaton and Liam Neeson.

2010s 
For his portrayal of "sensitive" villain Sy Ableman, in Joel and Ethan Coen's 2009 film, A Serious Man, which was nominated for Best Picture at the 2010 Academy Awards, he became widely known. About that character, Film Confessional said, "Sy Ableman is as great a contemporary movie villain as The Joker, Hans Landa, or Anton Chigurh.... The character Fred Melamed contrives is the year's most brilliant force of destruction." For his performance in A Serious Man, Melamed, along with the Coen Brothers, and the film's Ensemble and Casting Directors won Film Independent's Independent Spirit Robert Altman Award. New York magazine listed Melamed's work as among the Best Performances of the Decade, and Empire called Sy Ableman "One of The Best Coen Bros. Characters of All Time". Several leading U.S. critics, including A. O. Scott of The New York Times, Michael Phillips of the Chicago Tribune, and Roger Ebert all said his performance was worthy of Academy Award nomination.

On television, Melamed starred with Maria Bamford in the Netflix comedy Lady Dynamite, on FX's Emmy Award-winning Fargo, Hulu's Golden Globe Award-nominated Casual, the Fox comedy New Girl, and Verizon Go90's sports send-up Now We're Talking. He is a present or past recurring guest star on USA Network's Benched, Showtime's House of Lies, HBO's Girls, Childrens Hospital, Blunt Talk, FX's Married, and Trial & Error. In previous seasons, he played Larry David's smug psychiatrist, Dr. Arthur Thurgood, on Curb Your Enthusiasm, tough-guy jurist Judge Alan Karpman on The Good Wife, and played himself in the CBS situation comedy The Crazy Ones with Robin Williams and Sarah Michelle Gellar. In 2017, he appeared as a special guest star in the acclaimed Fargo episode "The Law of Non-Contradiction". He also appeared in 2 episodes of Brooklyn Nine-Nine as fantasy author D.C. Parlov.

Melamed appeared in the Sundance film Lemon (2017), a collaboration with Brett Gelman and Janicza Bravo, Brawl in Cell Block 99 opposite Vince Vaughn, Sean McGinly's Silver Lake, which he starred in with Martin Starr, and Dragged Across Concrete. Melamed had previously starred as Sam in Lake Bell's In a World..., winner of the Waldo Salt Screenwriting Award at the Sundance Film Festival, opposite Kurt Russell and Richard Jenkins in Bone Tomahawk, and re-teamed with the Coen brothers and co-stars George Clooney, Tilda Swinton, and Ralph Fiennes in Hail, Caesar! (2016).  Prior to that, he had starred in Get on Up (2014), a bio-pic about the life of James Brown, and opposite Elliott Gould, as auteur/director Bob Wilson, in Fred Won't Move Out, a film about the decline of a stubborn patriarch and his family. Other 2010s appearances included The Dictator (2012), with Sacha Baron Cohen and Sir Ben Kingsley, where Melamed appeared in a cameo as the Director of the dictator's Nuclear Weapons Program, and Some Kind of Beautiful, where Melamed played a villain, opposite Pierce Brosnan and Jessica Alba.

On Broadway in 2011, after a long hiatus from the theatre, Melamed originated the roles of The Father in Ethan Coen's Talking Cure, and Thomas Moran in Elaine May's George Is Dead, two of the one-act plays that comprised Relatively Speaking. Subsequently, Melamed took on the role of Vanya in the Guild Hall production of Uncle Vanya, about which The New York Times said he gave "an excellent (...) multi-layered performance (...) Mr. Melamed easily inhabits the comic, awkward lover, but also brings out Vanya's vast loneliness".

As a writer, he has produced screenplays including Girl of the Perfume River, A Jones for Gash, The Asshat Project, and is currently at work on a long-form, television version of The Preservationist, a fictional drama inspired by the case of Melamed's college friend, Edward Forbes Smiley III, a renowned cartographic expert and dealer, who admitted to having been the most brazen and prolific map thief of all time.

In 2019, Melamed acted in the crime thriller Lying and Stealing alongside Theo James and Emily Ratajkowski. The film was a modest critical success with Dennis Harvey of Variety writing, "Lying and Stealing manages to be a retro escapist pleasure — one whose cleverness might actually have been muffled by flashier surface assets."

2020s 
Melamed joined the Marvel Cinematic Universe in WandaVision as Arthur Hart, Vision's boss. In 2020 he appeared in Emma Seligman's directorial debut Shiva Baby. The film premiered at the Toronto International Film Festival and received critical acclaim. The following year he appeared in Nikole Beckwith's pregnancy comedy Together Together starring Ed Helms, and Patti Harrison. The film also received critical plaudits. In 2021, Melamed was named by a host of prominent critics and film professionals in Vulture and New York Magazine as one of "The 32 Greatest Character Actors Working Today".

Personal life
After living in the Hamptons hamlet of Montauk, N.Y. for many years, Melamed moved with his wife, Leslee, and twin sons to Los Angeles in 2013. Both of the Melamed children were diagnosed with autism and he and his wife have been involved in advocacy for persons living with autism spectrum disorder and their families. Melamed and his wife divorced in 2021.

Filmography

Film

Television

Theatre

Video games

Awards and nominations

References

External links

1956 births
20th-century American male actors
21st-century American male actors
American adoptees
American male film actors
American male television actors
American male voice actors
American people of Russian-Jewish descent
American people of South African-Jewish descent
Autism activists
Hampshire College alumni
Hollywood Hills High School alumni
Jewish American male actors
Living people
Male actors from New York City
Yale School of Drama alumni
Riverdale Country School alumni
21st-century American Jews